Araluen is a suburb of the town of Alice Springs, in the Northern Territory, Australia. It is on the western side of Alice Springs.

The name of the suburb is an Aboriginal word meaning "place of waterlilies". The subdivision on which the suburb was built was named after the property belonging to aviation pioneer Edward Connellan, which in turn was named after his parents' property in Victoria.

Araluen Cultural Precinct contains the Araluen Arts Centre, the Museum of Central Australia, Strehlow Research Centre and other cultural bodies and sites.

References

Suburbs of Alice Springs